Meet the In-Laws is a 2011 South Korean film directed by Kim Jin-young, starring Song Sae-byeok and Lee Si-young.

The Korean title literally translates to "Dangerous Formal Greeting Between Families of the Bride and Bridegroom," hence the alternate English titles Clash of the Families and Dangerous Meeting.

A comedic take on star-crossed lovers set after the 1988 Seoul Olympics, the film explores the deep-rooted regionalism that has dogged various aspects of Korean society, particularly the antagonism between people from southeastern Gyeongsang and people from Jeolla.

Plot
Naive, pure-hearted Hyun-joon writes romance comics under the pseudonym "Hyun-ji." He becomes pen pals with Da-hong, and the two fall in love and begin dating. When Da-hong reveals that her father is forcing her to go on matchmaking dates with other men, Hyun-joon impulsively decides to propose to her. But Hyun-joon hails from humble roots in South Jeolla Province, and the couple knows that Da-hong's wealthy Gyeongsang family will instantly disapprove of him because of this. Unbeknownst to them, their respective fathers were also bitter rivals in high school baseball. So when Hyun-joon goes to Busan to ask for Da-hong's hand in marriage, he hides his accent and pretends to be from Apgujeong, the ritziest area in Seoul. As her relatives scrutinize, intimidate and spy on him, Hyun-joon is determined to overcome all their obstacles and marry Da-hong.

Cast
 Song Sae-byeok as Hyun-joon
 Lee Si-young as Da-hong 
 Baek Yoon-sik as Young-kwang
 Kim Soo-mi as Choon-ja
 Kim Eung-soo as Se-dong
 Park Chul-min as Dae-sik
 Kim Jung-nan as Young-ja
 Jung Sung-hwa as Woon-bong
 Park Hyo-joo as Jin-kyung
 Kim Do-yeon as Yoon-sook
 Jung Woong-in as man on blind date (cameo)
 Lee Young-beom as Park Nam-jung's manager (cameo)
 Gil Hae-yeon as Housekeeper (cameo)
 Kim Yang-woo as Gay boyfriend (cameo)
 Choi Jae-hwan as Jeolla old-timer (cameo)
 Lee Han-wi as Coffee shop DJ (cameo)
 Park Nam-jung as himself (cameo)
 Ha Il-seong as narrator

Box office
Meet the In-Laws was the ninth best-selling Korean film of 2011, grossing  (or ) with 2,595,625 tickets sold.

Spin-off

Kim Jin-young directed a spin-off in 2015, Enemies In-Law. Though not technically a sequel given its different characters, the film's plot is also about an engaged couple facing familial disapproval, this time because the woman is from a family of police officers and the man's parents are criminals.

References

External links 
  
 Meet the In-Laws at Naver 
  
 
 
 

2011 films
2010s Korean-language films
South Korean comedy-drama films
2011 comedy-drama films
Films set in South Jeolla Province
2010s South Korean films